Sinezona plicata is a species of minute sea snail, a marine gastropod mollusk or micromollusk in the family Scissurellidae, the little slit snails.

Description
The shell attains a height of 2 mm.

Distribution
This marine species occurs off the Philippines and Australia.

References

External links
 To Encyclopedia of Life
 To World Register of Marine Species

Scissurellidae
Gastropods described in 1899